Public transport in New Zealand exists in many of the country's urban areas, and takes a number of forms. Bus transport is the main form of public transport. Two major cities, Auckland and Wellington, also have suburban rail systems that have been gaining more patronage and new investment in recent years. Some cities also operate local ferry services. There are no rapid transit metros and no remaining tram (i.e. light rail) systems active anywhere in New Zealand (except for some museum systems and a tourist-oriented service at Wynyard Quarter in Auckland and in Christchurch), though trams (and their horse-drawn predecessors) once had a major role in New Zealand's public transport.

Usage
The use of public transport in New Zealand is low. According to the 2013 New Zealand census, 4.2% of those who worked travelled to work by bus, 1.6% travelled by train, and more than 7 in 10 people travelled to work in a vehicle they drove themselves. The Household Travel Survey proportion of public transport trips was even lower at 2.3% in 2013/14. These figures are for the whole of New Zealand and include centres that may have limited or no public transport.

However, use of public transport was higher in major cities, which have more developed systems. In Wellington City, 16.8% of workers travelled by bus, more than twice as many as the next highest, Auckland City (6.5%).

In 2001, Wendell Cox, a public policy consultant, described the Auckland Regional Council's (ARC) plan to increase public transport to the downtown area to 20% of total share as "a simply unachievable goal". He also described as "a fantasy" Christchurch's plans for an increase to 10–15% by 2018.

As can be seen from this table, there has been minimal increase over 5 years – public transport mode % of total trip legs by region (from NZ Household Travel Survey) –

More up to date figures are available for numbers of bus passengers, which show declines in most areas outside the main cities -

Modes
Buses are the most common form of public transport in New Zealand, making up the majority of trips in every city that has public transport (and often being the only public transport mode available). InterCity and SKIP Bus are the only companies operating city to city bus transportations. They are followed by trains, which are found in Wellington and Auckland. Ferries also play a role, mainly in Auckland but also in other cities. Trams in New Zealand, while once common in many cities and towns, now survive only as heritage displays. Cable cars have also been employed; the Dunedin cable tramway system was both the second and second-last to operate in the world, while the Wellington Cable Car is now a funicular.

Provision by area

Auckland

Public transport in Auckland is managed by Auckland Transport, a CCO of Auckland Council, under the AT Metro brand. It consists of buses, trains, and ferries. The Auckland public transport system is New Zealand's largest by total passenger volume, although not by trips per capita.

Buses are the most widely used form of public transport in Auckland. They are operated by a number of companies, including NZ Bus , Ritchies Transport, Howick and Eastern Buses, GoBus, Waiheke Bus Company(Fullers360 Group), Pavlovich Coachlines and Tranzurban Auckland. The route network is dense, covering all parts of the Auckland urban area (including Waiheke Island).

Auckland also has a commuter rail system, one of two in the country. The system uses AM class electric trains, following the electrification of the Auckland rail network in 2014. There are four lines, designated Western Line, Onehunga Line, Southern Line, and Eastern Line. The trains are operated by Transdev Auckland.

Ferries also play a significant role in Auckland's transport network — more so than in other New Zealand cities. Ferries travel between the city centre and a number of destinations, including several points on the North Shore, Half Moon Bay, Waiheke Island, Rangitoto Island, and Great Barrier Island. The largest operator is Fullers360 Group.

Auckland, like many others in New Zealand, previously operated trams. The first, horse-drawn, ran in 1884. Electric trams were introduced in 1902, operating until 1956. The Museum of Transport and Technology subsequently constructed a 2 km heritage line linking its two sites and Auckland Zoo. A tourist-oriented tram service has operated at Wynyard Quarter since 2011.

Christchurch

The Christchurch public transport system is based principally around buses, although the city also has a ferry service and a heritage tramway. The services are operated under the Metro brand by bus companies Red Bus and Go Bus, administered by the regional council, Environment Canterbury.

Buses operate to all parts of the Christchurch urban area, including Lyttelton. There are also services to outlying towns such as Rangiora, Lincoln, and Burnham. There are around 40 routes in total, A free shuttle in the central city with hybrid-electric Designline buses was formerly operated until the 2011 Christchurch earthquake.

Since 12 November 2007, Christchurch has been carrying out the first New Zealand trial for bikes on buses, which amongst other things gives cyclists access through the Lyttelton road tunnel.

A ferry service operates between Lyttelton and Diamond Harbour, a small settlement on the opposite side of Lyttelton Harbour.

Christchurch used to operate an extensive tram network, but this service was discontinued in 1954. In 1995, a heritage tramway was re-opened in the city centre, primarily serving tourists. The circuit was damaged by the 2011 Christchurch earthquake and has since reopened.

Dunedin

Dunedin has a substantial public transport system based around buses. There are 14 routes, covering the Dunedin urban area (including Mosgiel and Port Chalmers), plus a service to Waikouaiti and Palmerston. Services are administered by the Otago Regional Council, and run mainly by Citibus (owned by the Dunedin City Council) and Passenger Transport, (a private company based in Invercargill).

The city formerly operated other forms of public transport — the Dunedin cable tramway system (similar to the famous San Francisco cable cars) operated between 1881 and 1957, and electric trams operated on several routes from 1900 to 1956. Commuter trains ran from the Dunedin Railway Station to Mosgiel and Port Chalmers until 1979 and 1982, respectively.

Hamilton

Hamilton has a bus system under the name BUSIT covering most of its urban area, with around 25 routes. There are also bus services to (and sometimes between) other towns in the Waikato region — Taupo, Huntly, Coromandel, Thames, Tokoroa, Meremere, Te Kauwhata, Cambridge, Paeroa, Raglan, Mangakino, and Te Awamutu are among the destinations.

Hamilton formerly had a commuter train to Auckland, the Waikato Connection. Proposals were floated in 2007 to re-instate the service. The proposal was dropped in a 2011 report in favour of extension only from Pukekohe to Tuakau. Plans for a commuter service between Hamilton and Papakura were revisited in 2017 and received funding in 2019. The service, called Te Huia, launched in April 2021.

Invercargill

Invercargill has a bus service with eight routes  (four of which are loops that have different designations for the inbound and outbound sections). They operate from a hub in the central city, and are administered by the Invercargill City Council. Some of the routes are free, and others are free outside peak hours.

Invercargill formerly had the southernmost tram system in the world; construction began in January 1911 and the network operated from 26 March 1912 to 10 September 1952.  At its greatest extent, it had four separate routes.  Commuter trains also ran along the Bluff Branch railway line between Invercargill and Bluff from the line's opening in 1867 until the final service was cancelled in 1967.  Multiple stops within Invercargill were serviced, and as late as 1950, seven trains ran each way on the average weekday.

New Plymouth

New Plymouth has a bus system with nine routes covering most of its urban area, operated by Tranzit Coachlines. There are also bus services to other towns in the New Plymouth District; Bell Block, Inglewood, Oakura and Waitara. Services are administered by the Taranaki Regional Council.

New Plymouth formerly operated electric trams over four routes between 10 March 1916 and 23 July 1954, as well as New Zealands only regional trolleybus system between 1950 and 1967.

Wellington

Wellington has the highest percentage of citizens using public transport in the country. Its public transport system, organised under the Metlink brand, consists of buses, trains, ferries, and a funicular (the Wellington Cable Car).

The most widely used form of public transport is buses, which are operated mainly by Tranzurban Wellington and NZ Bus (both using multiple brands). The network extends across the whole region, with slightly over 100 routes and around 2,800 stops. Until its final closure in 2017 some bus routes were served by the Wellington trolleybus system, which replaced the city's historic Wellington tramway system.

The second most popular form of public transport is rail, which makes up around a third of the total. Wellington's commuter rail network carries passengers between the central city and suburban areas to the north, as well as to smaller towns in Wairarapa. It is the larger of New Zealand's two commuter rail systems, with 49 stations, and is mostly electrified.  The two non-electrified services are diesel trains: the Wairarapa Connection from Masterton and the Capital Connection from Palmerston North. The latter is not run by the suburban operator, Transdev, but by long distance operator The Great Journeys of New Zealand; however, in practice, it serves as a commuter service.

The remainder of trips use either the Wellington ferry system or the Wellington Cable Car. The ferry service operates across Wellington Harbour, connecting Eastbourne, Matiu/Somes Island, and the central city. The iconic Wellington Cable Car (strictly speaking, a funicular, rather than a true cable car) travels between the central city and the suburb of Kelburn, and is still used as a regular means of transport.

Other areas
Blenheim has a small bus service operating on Mondays and Wednesdays. It has two loop routes, serving the northern and southern halves of the town from a central hub. It is operated by Ritchies Coachlines on behalf of the Marlborough regional council.
Gisborne operates a bus service covering most of the town's urban area. There are six routes. It is run by a local company on behalf of Gisborne District Council.
Levin had an internal bus service consisting of three loop routes converging on a central hub, operated by Madge Coachlines on behalf of Horizons Regional Council. There are a few buses to Palmerston North, Foxton Beach and Waikanae, operated by Uzabus.
Masterton has an internal bus network consisting of three routes, operated as part of the Wellington regional transport system. There are also bus connections to nearby towns, and regular train service to Wellington.
Napier-Hastings had a bus service with nine routes — three in Napier proper, three in Hastings proper, and routes between Hastings and Napier, between Hastings and Flaxmere, and between Hastings and Havelock North. The buses are operated by Go Bus Transport Ltd. They are funded by the regional council. From 7 June 2022 three of Hastings' bus routes are replaced by 3 on-demand minibuses.
Nelson has four bus routes within its urban area, forming loops into the city's suburbs from a hub at Wakatu Square. There is also a separate service to Richmond, which is outside Nelson's official boundaries but which is often considered part of the Nelson urban area.
Palmerston North's public transport system consists of five bus routes, forming loops through the city's suburbs from a central station in the city's centre. The outward and inward portions of each loop are given distinct labels. There are also less frequent services to places outside the immediate urban area, such as Ashhurst, Feilding, Levin, Taihape, and the Linton Army Camp.
Pukekohe has an internal bus loop operated as part of the Auckland transport system, and regular train service to Papakura and onwards to Auckland.
Queenstown has four bus routes under the brand Orbus as part of the Otago Regional Council. They connect Queenstown with the areas of Fernhill, Frankton, Kelvin Heights, Jacks Point, Arthurs Point, Lake Hayes and Arrowtown.
Rotorua has a network of ten bus routes, serving all parts of the urban area. The buses are administered by the Bay of Plenty's regional council. There are links to other towns in the area.
Taupō has three routes under the BUSIT service covering the Taupō urban area and to other towns in the Waikato.
Tauranga employs buses and ferries in its public transport system. Its bus system has around a dozen routes, covering all major parts of its urban area. The buses run seven days a week.  There are also bus connections to other places in the Bay of Plenty region. The buses are administered by the Bay of Plenty regional council. Ferry services run between central Tauranga, Mount Maunganui and Matakana Island.
Timaru's public transport network had four bus routes within its urban area from 2013, plus a route to nearby Temuka, until the Gleniti, Grantlea and Watlington routes were replaced by seven on-demand 11 or 13 seat 'MyWay' vans, with bike racks, from February 2020. Fares had previously covered only 15% of costs. The remaining urban route is a loop, with a hub in the city centre. The trial service was made permanent in 2021, after ridership increased by 16%.
West Coast Regional Council supports taxis under the Total Mobility scheme in Greymouth, Westport and Hokitika only. It doesn't include any buses, or the TranzAlpine train. West Coast has the lowest proportion of public transport journeys in the country at 0.1% of all trips. In the past local public transport was provided by local tramways, local buses to Greymouth, Blackball, Dobson, Wallsend, Taylorville, Blaketown and Hokitika and passenger trains on the Blackball branch until 1940, Conns Creek until 1931, Midland Line until 1986, Ross until 1972, Seddonville until 1946 and Westport until 1967.
Whanganui operates buses on four loop routes, originating from a central terminus and passing through the city's suburbs. As in Palmerston North (whose service is administered by the same region), the outward and inward portions of each loop are given distinct labels. There are also buses to Taihape and Palmerston North.
Whangārei has a bus service administered by the regional council, funded by the district council and Land Transport New Zealand, and operated by Adams Travelines (a NZBus owned company) under the name CityLink Whāngarei. The system has ten routes, covering most of the Whāngarei urban area. It runs six days a week.

Overview table
The table below lists towns in New Zealand that have or once had public transport systems. It includes only internal services (as opposed to services between towns), and does not include services run primarily for heritage reasons.

Funding 
From 1950 to 1964 urban passenger trips fell from 198 to 127 million a year, which prompted the Carter Report on Urban Transport, published in 1970. The report recommended subsidies to relieve traffic congestion, air pollution and provide for the poor. In 1971, 65 private bus operators lobbied Sir Keith Holyoake to implement its recommendations on capital subsidies. In November 1971 the Ministry of Transport Amendment Act 1971 set up the Urban Passenger Transport Council to give subsidies and Regional councils were also able to use rates. Funding was initially split equally between rail and buses, but later changed to favour buses. From 1989 funding was allocated by Transit New Zealand, until the 1996 Land Transport Management Act transferred it to Transfund New Zealand and the Land Transport Management Act 2003 to the National Land Transport Fund. In 2018-21 NLTF committed $1,231,715,400 to operating costs and $693,188,400 to infrastructure.

See also
Rail transport in New Zealand
Trams in New Zealand
Transport in New Zealand

References

External links
Current Issues (from the New Zealand Ministry of Transport)
The Hub (private forum for discussion of public transport in New Zealand)
History of buses and coaches – Te Ara encyclopedia (on 7 pages)